General elections were held in Japan on 29 January 1967. The result was a victory for the Liberal Democratic Party, which won 277 of the 486 seats. Voter turnout was 73.99%.

Results

By prefecture

References

Japan
1967 elections in Japan
General elections in Japan
January 1967 events in Asia
Election and referendum articles with incomplete results